Motian in Tokyo is a live album by Paul Motian released on the German JMT label released in 1992. The album features performances by Motian with guitarist Bill Frisell and tenor saxophonist Joe Lovano and was rereleased on the Winter & Winter label in 2003.

Reception
The Allmusic review by Scott Yanow awarded the album 3 stars, stating: "The music is reminiscent of both Coleman and Keith Jarrett in spots, and is often floating and wandering, generally staying quite coherent, with some fiery moments. But overall, this interesting but not essential set does not live up to its great potential".

Track listing
All compositions by Paul Motian except as indicated
 "From Time to Time" - 6:58
 "Shakalaka" - 6:18
 "Kathelin Gray" (Ornette Coleman, Pat Metheny) - 6:54
 "The Hoax" - 1:00
 "Mumbo Jumbo" - 10:43
 "Birdsong I" - 1:34
 "Mode VI" - 7:29
 "Two Women from Padua" - 4:53
 "It Is" - 5:11
 "Birdsong II" - 1:32
Recorded in Tokyo, Japan on March 28 & 29, 1991

Personnel
Paul Motian - drums
Bill Frisell - electric guitar
Joe Lovano - tenor saxophone

References 

1992 live albums
Paul Motian live albums
JMT Records live albums
Winter & Winter Records live albums